= Gwent County FA Intermediate Cup =

Regional knock-out competition for clubs

- Founded: 2019
- Region: Wales
- Current champions: Newbridge Town (2025–26)

The Gwent County Football Association Intermediate Cup is the regional knock-out competition for clubs beneath the umbrella of the Gwent County Football Association in South Wales.

== Previous winners ==
Information sourced from the Gwent County Football Association website unless otherwise indicated.

=== 2010s ===
- 2019–20: – Thornwell Red & White

=== 2020s ===
- 2020–21: – No Competition (Covid-19 pandemic)
- 2021–22: – No Competition (Covid-19 pandemic)
- 2022–23: – Pontypool Town
- 2023–24: – Aberbargoed Town
- 2024–25: – Fleur de Lys
- 2025–26: – Newbridge Town
